Dealing with Disaster in Japan: Responses to the Flight JL123 Crash is a 2011 book written by Christopher P. Hood, a lecturer of Japanese studies at Cardiff University, and published by Routledge. It is about Japan Airlines Flight 123, and together with its sequel Osutaka: A Chronicle of Loss In the World's Largest Single Plane Crash, are the only English-language books entirely about that accident. The book discusses the accident and its societal aftermath and compares and contrasts the response to JL123 to that of other accidents. The audience for the book involves those in studies of Japan and those studying aircraft accidents, and it is aimed at both academics and non-academics.

Background
Hood had invited Peter Mathews, the father of British JAL123 victim Kimble Mathews, to speak to his students. Hood stated that he had an emotional response to the father's testimony, so he decided to research the accident. Peter Mathews provided access to a diary and photographs taken in 1985. Hood wrote the book because much of the information was in Japanese while there was also a lot of interest in the incident from those outside Japan.

Contents

The book includes nine chapters, arranged in five parts.

Hood took almost 100 photographs of the Osutaka Pilgrimage. Several photos were labeled as having been taken in 2010 and one is labeled as a 2009 photo; the others do not have their dates mentioned.

The book includes a list of victims in Japanese and English. The footer of each page has several names of the deceased, so the list is spread across the book.  of Osaka University stated that the names were used "as a reminder of the cost of human life" and that "This was an effective presentation of information that successfully expressed the weight of human loss and of this book’s implicit story of human tragedy."

Reception

Jeff Kingston, Director of Asian Studies, Temple University Japan, wrote in The Japan Times that Dealing with Disaster in Japan was an "excellent book" that "brilliantly" describes the "haunting saga".

Otani concluded that "I believe this book will become one of the classics among disaster studies in Japan, as well as works of Japanese history and other works related to issues of social and collective memory".

References
 Otani, Junko (Osaka University). "Dealing with Disaster in Japan: Responses to the Flight JL123 Crash" (book review). Social Science Japan Journal (2013) 16 (1): 185-188. doi: 10.1093/ssjj/jys042. - Available at EBSCOHost Accession #85099168.

Notes

External links
 Dealing with Disaster in Japan: Responses to the Flight JL123 Crash (Routledge Official Website)
 "Christopher Hood's Research about JL123." - Hood's website

2011 non-fiction books
Japan Airlines accidents and incidents
Routledge books
History books about Japan